Harpstedt is a Samtgemeinde ("collective municipality") in the district of Oldenburg, in Lower Saxony, Germany. Its seat is in the village Harpstedt.

The Samtgemeinde Harpstedt consists of the following municipalities:
 Beckeln 
 Colnrade 
 Dünsen 
 Groß Ippener 
 Harpstedt
 Kirchseelte 
 Prinzhöfte 
 Winkelsett

Samtgemeinden in Lower Saxony